Indra Kahfi Ardhiyasa (born 5 October 1986) is an Indonesian professional footballer who plays as a centre-back for Liga 1 club Bhayangkara. His younger brother, Andritany Ardhiyasa is also football player. He is also a Police Inspector 2nd Class in the Indonesian National Police for Mobile Brigade Corps (Brimob) unit.

International career 
He made his debut with Indonesia on 6 September 2016 in a friendly against Malaysia as a substitute.

Honours

Club
Bhayangkara
 Liga 1: 2017

References

External links
 Indra Kahfi Ardhiyasa at Soccerway
 Indra Kahfi Ardhiyasa at Liga Indonesia

1986 births
Living people
Betawi people
Indonesian footballers
Liga 1 (Indonesia) players
Persita Tangerang players
Deltras F.C. players
Indonesian Premier Division players
Persikota Tangerang players
PSPS Pekanbaru players
Bhayangkara F.C. players
Sportspeople from Jakarta
Indonesia international footballers
Association football defenders